Bir al-Maksur or Beer el-Maksura is an Arab Bedouin local council in the Northern District of Israel located  north-west of Nazareth. The villagers belong to the Arab el-Hujeirat Bedouin tribe, settled there in the 1950s.

History and archaeology
Flint from the Mousterian culture, made with the Levallois technique, in addition to remains from Pre-Pottery Neolithic A and B have been found during excavations.

Sherds from  Iron age I, and possibly Iron age II have also been found.

A burial cave, with ceramics and artefacts dating to the late Roman period, that is, 3rd–4th centuries CE, has been unearthed.

In 1881, the PEF's  Survey of Western Palestine  noted at Kh. el Maksur: "Heaps of stones."

Notable people

 Mohammad Ghadir (born 1991), professional football player who plays for Bnei Yehuda Tel Aviv F.C.

See also
Arab localities in Israel

References

Bibliography

External links 
 Welcome To Bir al-Maksura
Survey of Western Palestine, Map 5:  IAA, Wikimedia commons 

Arab localities in Israel
Archaeological sites in Israel
Local councils in Northern District (Israel)
1950s establishments in Israel
Pre-Pottery Neolithic B